The 1991 Asian Women's Handball Championship, the third Asian Championship, which was taking place from 22 to 31 August 1991 in Hiroshima, Japan. It acted as the Asian qualifying tournament for the 1992 Summer Olympics.

Standings

Results

Final standing

References
Results

External links
www.asianhandball.com

Asian Handball Championships
Asian
H
International handball competitions hosted by Japan
August 1991 sports events in Asia